Jean-Gilles Hnamuko (born 2 March 1996) is a New Caledonian international footballer who plays as a goalkeeper for Luxembourger club Alisontia Steinsel.

References

1996 births
Living people
New Caledonian footballers
People from Nouméa
Association football goalkeepers
AS Mont-Dore players
AS Lössi players
Racing Club de France Football players
US Roye-Noyon players
R.D. Águeda players
FC Swift Hesperange players
Championnat National 2 players
Division d'Honneur players
Luxembourg Division of Honour players
New Caledonia international footballers
New Caledonian expatriate footballers
Expatriate footballers in Portugal
Expatriate footballers in Luxembourg